Nea Dimmata is a village in the Paphos District of Cyprus, located  northeast of Polis Chrysochous.

References

Communities in Paphos District